Iira is a village in Rapla Parish, Rapla County in northwestern Estonia.

Rapla Airfield (Kuusiku Airfield) (ICAO: EERA) is located in Iira.

References

 

Villages in Rapla County